Jordan Cornfield (born October 28, 1982 in Edmonton, Alberta) is a Canadian lacrosse player who has played with the Colorado Mammoth and the Edmonton Rush in the National Lacrosse League.

One of his brothers, Graedon, also signed to the Colorado Mammoth team in 2007.  Jordan was playing with the Western Lacrosse Association in 2009.

Statistics

NLL

WLA

References

1982 births
Living people
Colorado Mammoth players
Canadian lacrosse players
Edmonton Rush players
Sportspeople from Edmonton